Williams Township may refer to the following places:

 Williams Township, Lonoke County, Arkansas
 Williams Township, Sangamon County, Illinois
 Williams Township, Calhoun County, Iowa
 Williams Township, Hamilton County, Iowa
 Williams Township, Bay County, Michigan (Williams Charter Township, Michigan)
 Williams Township, Aitkin County, Minnesota
 Williams Township, Benton County, Missouri
 Williams Township, Stone County, Missouri
 Williams Township, Wayne County, Missouri
 Williams Township, Chatham County, North Carolina
 Williams Township, Columbus County, North Carolina
 Williams Township, Martin County, North Carolina
 Williams Township, Kidder County, North Dakota
 Williams Township, Nelson County, North Dakota
 Williams Township, Dauphin County, Pennsylvania
 Williams Township, Northampton County, Pennsylvania

See also

Williams (disambiguation)

Township name disambiguation pages